Leone Fedeli (died January 1613) was a Roman Catholic prelate who served as Bishop of Lavello (1605–1613).

Biography
Fedeli was born in Vimercate, Italy in 1561 and ordained a priest in the Order of Saint Benedict.
On 7 January 1605, he was appointed by Pope Clement VIII as Bishop of Lavello. On 16 January 1605, he was consecrated bishop by Pietro Aldobrandini, Archbishop of Ravenna, with Fabio Blondus de Montealto, Titular Patriarch of Jerusalem, and Tommaso Lapis, Bishop of Fano, serving as co-consecrators. 
He served as Bishop of Lavello until his death in January 1613.

References

External links and additional sources
 (Chronology of Bishops) 
 (Chronology of Bishops) 

17th-century Italian Roman Catholic bishops
1613 deaths
Bishops appointed by Pope Clement VIII
Benedictine bishops
1561 births
People from Vimercate